Per Joakim Palme (born 18 May 1958) is a Swedish political scientist and sociologist. He is the eldest son of Olof Palme, who was Prime Minister of Sweden until his assassination in 1986, and his wife Lisbeth Palme.

Career 
Since 2009, Palme is a professor of political science at Uppsala University. Since 2002 he has been CEO of the Institute for Future Studies. Between 2003 and 2009, he was adjunct professor of sociology at Stockholm University. In 2009 he was appointed Adjunct Professor at the Center for Velfærdsstatsforskning at the University of Southern Denmark.

See also 
 Walter Korpi

References

External links 

 CV med bibliografi
 Joakim Palmes hemsida Institutet för framtidsstudier.

1958 births
Living people
Swedish political scientists
Swedish sociologists
Academic staff of Uppsala University
Academic staff of Stockholm University
Children of national leaders